Chhaprauli Assembly constituency is one of the 403 constituencies of the Uttar Pradesh Legislative Assembly, India. It is a part of the Baghpat district and one of the five assembly constituencies in the Baghpat Lok Sabha constituency. First election in this assembly constituency was held in 1967 after the "Delimitation order" was passed and the constituency was constituted in 1967. The constituency was assigned identification number 50 after the "Delimitation of Parliamentary and Assembly Constituencies Order, 2008" was passed.

Wards / Areas
Extent of Chhaprauli Assembly constituency is KCs Chhaprauli, Binoli, PCs Mukarrabpur Kandera, Kishanpur, Asara, Bhudpur, Kasimpur Kheri of Baraut KC, Doghat NP, 
Tikri NP & Chhaprauli NP of Baraut Tehsil.

Members of the Legislative Assembly

Election results

2022

16th Vidhan Sabha: 2012 General Elections

Source:

See also
Baghpat district
Baghpat Lok Sabha constituency
Sixteenth Legislative Assembly of Uttar Pradesh
Uttar Pradesh Legislative Assembly

References

External links
 

Assembly constituencies of Uttar Pradesh
Bagpat district
Constituencies established in 1967
1967 establishments in Uttar Pradesh